Sierville is a commune in the Seine-Maritime department in the Normandy region in northern France.

Geography
The A151 autoroute runs through the middle of the commune's territory.

Population

Places of interest
 The church of St. Philibert, dating from the eleventh century.
 A thirteenth-century building in a courtyard near the presbytery.
 The eighteenth-century chateau of Bosc-Laurent.

See also
Communes of the Seine-Maritime department

References

Communes of Seine-Maritime